The field sparrow (Spizella pusilla) is a small New World sparrow in the family Passerellidae. The head is grey with a rust-coloured crown, white eye-ring and pink bill. The upper parts are brown streaked with black and buff, the breast is buff, the belly is white and the tail is forked. There are two different colour morphs, one being greyer and the other more rufous.

The field sparrow is distributed across eastern Canada and the eastern United States, with northern populations migrating southwards to southern United States and Mexico in the fall. The typical habitat of this bird is bushy country with shrubs and grassland. The nest is a cup-shaped construction built on the ground and hidden beneath a bush or clump of grass. The birds forage on the ground or in low vegetation, feeding mainly on seeds and insects. The population is thought to be in slow decline, but it is a common species with a wide range, and the International Union for Conservation of Nature has assessed its conservation status as being of "least concern".

Description
Adults have brown upperparts, a buffy breast, a white belly, two whitish wing bars and a dark-brown forked tail. They have a grey face, a rusty crown, a white eye ring and a pink bill. They have rusty markings behind the eye. There are grey and rufous colour variants. Males and females have a similar appearance with males being slightly larger than females.

Distribution and habitat
Their breeding habitat is brushy, shrubby fields across eastern North America. The nest is an open cup on the ground under a clump of grass or in a small thicket. They often breed more than once a season, each time they build a new nest, it will building the nest higher and higher off the ground as the season progresses.

These birds are permanent residents in the southern parts of their range. Northern birds migrate to the southern United States and Mexico.

Habits
These birds forage on the ground or in low vegetation, mainly eating insects and seeds. They may feed in small flocks outside the nesting season.

The male sings from a higher perch, such as a shrub or fencepost, which indicates his ownership of the nesting territory. The song is a series of sad whistles ending in a trill, the sound formed like the accelerating sound of a bouncing ball has the quality coming to rest, usually last long 4 seconds, both are often compared.

This bird's numbers expanded as settlers cleared forests in eastern North America, but may have declined in more recent times. Despite this, it is a common species with a wide range, and the International Union for Conservation of Nature has assessed its conservation status as being of "least concern".

References

Further reading

Book
 Carey, M., D. E. Burhans, and D. A. Nelson. 1994. Field Sparrow (Spizella pusilla). In The Birds of North America, No. 103 (A. Poole and F. Gill, Eds.). Philadelphia: The Academy of Natural Sciences; Washington, D.C.: The American Ornithologists’ Union.

Thesis
 Best LB. Ph.D. (1974). BREEDING ECOLOGY OF THE FIELD SPARROW (SPIZELLA PUSILLA). University of Illinois at Urbana-Champaign, United States, Illinois.
 Goldman PC. Ph.D. (1972). THE VOCAL BEHAVIOR OF THE FIELD SPARROW. The Ohio State University, United States, Ohio.
 Heckenlively DB. Ph.D. (1974). AGONISTIC AND COURTSHIP BEHAVIOR OF FIELD SPARROWS, SPIZELLA PUSILLA (WILSON). University of Michigan, United States, Michigan.
 Morrison-Parker C. Ph.D. (1977). EXPERIMENTAL INVESTIGATIONS OF THE VOCAL BEHAVIOR OF THE FIELD SPARROW (SPIZELLA PUSILLA). Indiana University, United States, Indiana.
 Olson JB. Ph.D. (1965). EFFECT OF TEMPERATURE AND SEASON ON THE BIOENERGETICS OF THE EASTERN FIELD SPARROW, SPIZELLA PUSILLA PUSILLA. University of Illinois at Urbana-Champaign, United States, Illinois.

Articles
 Adams RJJ & Brewer R. (1981). Autumn Selection of Breeding Location by Field Sparrows Spizella-Pusilla. Auk. vol 98, no 3. pp. 629–631.
 Allaire PN. (1972). Field Sparrow Uses Abandoned Nest for August Brood. Auk. vol 89, no 4.
 Beck CW & Watts BD. (1997). The effect of cover and food on space use by wintering song sparrows and field sparrows. Canadian Journal of Zoology. vol 75, no 10. p. 1636.
 Best LB. (1974). BLUE RACERS PREY ON FIELD SPARROW NESTS. Auk. vol 91, no 1. pp. 168–169.
 Best LB. (1974). UNUSUAL CASE OF NESTING PERSISTENCE IN A FEMALE FIELD SPARROW. Condor. vol 76, no 3. pp. 349–349.
 Best LB. (1977). Nestling Biology of the Field Sparrow. Auk. vol 94, no 2. pp. 308–319.
 Best LB. (1977). PATTERNS OF FEEDING FIELD SPARROW YOUNG. Wilson Bulletin. vol 89, no 4. pp. 625–627.
 Best LB. (1977). Territory Quality and Mating Success in the Field Sparrow Spizella-Pusilla. Condor. vol 79, no 2. pp. 192–204.
 Best LB. (1978). FIELD SPARROW REPRODUCTIVE SUCCESS AND NESTING ECOLOGY. Auk. vol 95, no 1. pp. 9–22.
 Best LB. (1979). EFFECTS OF FIRE ON A FIELD SPARROW POPULATION. American Midland Naturalist. vol 101, no 2. pp. 434–442.
 Bill MS & Dirk EB. (2001). Nest desertion by field sparrows and its possible influence on the evolution of Cowbird behavior. The Auk. vol 118, no 3. p. 770.
 Bolduc D. (1969). Early Date for the Field Sparrow Goodhue County Minnesota USA. Loon. vol 41, no 1.
 Borror DJ. (1977). RUFOUS-SIDED TOWHEES MIMICKING CAROLINA WREN AND FIELD SPARROW. Wilson Bulletin. vol 89, no 3. pp. 477–480.
 Briesmeister E & Clausing P. (1988). Egg Size in the Field Sparrow During Breeding. Falke. vol 34, no 11. pp. 360–365.
 Brooks EW. (1980). Interspecific Nesting of Clay-Colored Sparrows Spizella-Pallidae and Field Sparrows Spizella-Pusilla. Wilson Bulletin. vol 92, no 2. pp. 264–265.
 Browning NG, Dayton AD & Robel RJ. (1981). Comparative Preferences of Field Sparrows and Spizella-Pusilla and Cardinals Cardinalis-Cardinalis among 4 Propagated Seeds. Journal of Wildlife Management. vol 45, no 2. pp. 528–533.
 Carey M. (1990). EFFECTS OF BROOD SIZE AND NESTLING AGE ON PARENTAL CARE BY MALE FIELD SPARROWS (SPIZELLA-PUSILLA). Auk. vol 107, no 3. pp. 580–586.
 Dirk EB. (2000). Avoiding the nest: Responses of field sparrows to the Threat of nest predation. The Auk. vol 117, no 3. p. 803.
 Dirk EB. (2001). Enemy recognition by Field Sparrows. The Wilson Bulletin. vol 113, no 2. p. 189.
 Dirk EB, Bill MS & Michael DC. (2001). Regional variation in response of Field Sparrows to the threat of Brown-headed Cowbird parasitism. The Auk. vol 118, no 3. p. 776.
 Dooling RJ, Baylis JR & Zoloth SR. (1975). Auditory Sensitivity of the House Finch Carpodacus-Mexicanus and the Field Sparrow Spizella-Pusilla. Journal of the Acoustical Society of America. vol 58, no SUPPL 1. p. S122-S123.
 Dooling RJ, Peters SS & Searcy MH. (1979). AUDITORY-SENSITIVITY AND VOCALIZATIONS OF THE FIELD SPARROW (SPIZELLA-PUSILLA). Bulletin of the Psychonomic Society. vol 14, no 2. pp. 106–108.
 Evans EW. (1978). Nesting Responses of Field Sparrows Spizella-Pusilla to Plant Succession on a Michigan USA Oil Field. Condor. vol 80, no 1. pp. 34–40.
 Fretwell S. (1968). Habitat Distribution and Survival in the Field Sparrow Spizella-Pusilla. Bird Banding. vol 39, no 4. pp. 293–306.
 Fretwell SD. (1969). On Territorial Behavior and Other Factors Influencing Habitat Distribution in Birds Part 3 Breeding Success in a Local Population of Field Sparrows Spizella-Pusilla. Acta Biotheoretica. vol 19, no 1. pp. 45–52.
 Goodson JL. (1998). Territorial aggression and dawn song are modulated by septal vasotocin and vasoactive intestinal polypeptide in male field sparrows (Spizella pusilla). Hormones and Behavior. vol 34, no 1. pp. 67–77.
 Heckenlively DB. (1976). VARIATION IN CADENCE OF FIELD SPARROW SONGS. Wilson Bulletin. vol 88, no 4. pp. 588–602.
 Hoag DJ. (1999). Hybridization between Clay-colored sparrow and Field sparrow in northern Vermont. Wilson Bulletin. vol 111, no 4. pp. 581–584.
 Kipp FA. (1968). Youthful Plumage and Sexual Dimorphism in House Sparrow and Field Sparrow. Vogelwarte. vol 24, no 3–4. pp. 283–284.
 Liu W-C & Kroodsma DE. (1999). Song development by chipping sparrows and field sparrows. Animal Behaviour. vol 57, p. 1275.
 Nelson DA. (1988). FEATURE WEIGHTING IN SPECIES SONG RECOGNITION BY THE FIELD SPARROW (SPIZELLA-PUSILLA). Behaviour. vol 106, pp. 158–182.
 Nelson DA. (1989). Song Frequency as a Cue for Recognition of Species and Individuals in the Field Sparrow (Spizella Pusilla). Journal of Comparative Psychology. vol 103, no 2. pp. 171–176.
 Nelson DA. (1992). SONG OVERPRODUCTION AND SELECTIVE ATTRITION LEAD TO SONG SHARING IN THE FIELD SPARROW (SPIZELLA-PUSILLA). Behavioral Ecology and Sociobiology. vol 30, no 6. pp. 415–424.
 Nelson DA & Croner LJ. (1991). SONG CATEGORIES AND THEIR FUNCTIONS IN THE FIELD SPARROW (SPIZELLA-PUSILLA). Auk. vol 108, no 1. pp. 42–52.
 Nicholson CP. (1981). LIKELY NEST REUSE BY A FIELD SPARROW. Journal of Field Ornithology. vol 52, no 3. pp. 235–235.
 Olson JB & Kendeigh SC. (1980). Effect of Season on the Energetics Body Composition and Cage Activity on the Field Sparrow Spizella-Pusilla. Auk. vol 97, no 4. pp. 704–720.
 Raftovich RV, Jr. (1996). Unusually high field sparrow nest found. Oriole. vol 61, no 2–3. pp. 53–54.
 Robert H. (1971). 1st Record of Field Sparrow in California. California Birds. vol 2, no 2.
 Scherner ER. (1972). Field Sparrow Passer-Montanus Breeds in Hole of Tree Creeper. Ornithologische Mitteilungen. vol 24, no 1.
 Schneider KJ. (1981). Age Determination by Skull Pneumatization in the Field Sparrow. Journal of Field Ornithology. vol 52, no 1. pp. 57–59.
 Searcy WA. (1983). Response to Multiple Song Types in Male Song Sparrows Melospiza-Melodia and Field Sparrows Spizella-Pusilla. Animal Behaviour. vol 31, no 3. pp. 948–949.

External links

Field sparrow species account - Cornell Lab of Ornithology
Field sparrow - Spizella pusilla - USGS Patuxent Bird Identification InfoCenter
 
 
 
Field sparrow - Spizella pusilla description at BioKids at umich.edu

Spizella
Native birds of the Plains-Midwest (United States)
Native birds of the Eastern United States
Birds described in 1810
Taxa named by Alexander Wilson (ornithologist)